West Tennessee State Penitentiary (WTSP) is a Tennessee Department of Correction prison located in unincorporated Lauderdale County, Tennessee, near Henning. Site #1 of WTSP formerly housed the Cold Creek Correctional Facility.

The West Tennessee High Security Facility (WTHSF) became operational in 1990. In 1999 the Cold Creek Correctional Facility (CCCF) closed. CCCF was replaced by a medium security complex built next to WTHSF. The two complexes and the CCCF minimum security annex were operationally combined and became the WTSP.

Notable inmates
Notable prisoners held at the facility include:
 Letalvis Cobbins – convicted of the murders of Channon Christian and Christopher Newsom

References

External links

 "West Tennessee State Penitentiary." Tennessee Department of Correction.
 "West Tennessee High Security Facility." Tennessee Department of Correction. (Archive)

Buildings and structures in Lauderdale County, Tennessee
Prisons in Tennessee
1990 establishments in Tennessee